This is a list of notable events in music that took place in the year 1939.

Specific locations
1939 in British music
1939 in Norwegian music

Specific genres
1939 in country music
1939 in jazz

Events
 January 4- New band to be headed by Harry James, first trumpet with Benny Goodman, goes into rehearsal Jan. 6. Embryo outfit has already been dated for a short stay at the Statler Hotel, Boston, opening Feb. 1st. James has taken Buddy Rich from Bunny Berigan's orch to handle the drums.
 February – Recording of 'A-Tisket, A-Tasket' turned out by Ella Fitzgerald and Chick Webb for Decca has established a new eight-year high in sales for the industry. The sales on this 35c have already gone over 250,000. The company's previous record had been the 160,000 copies achieved by Bing Crosby's version of 'Sweet Leilani.'
 February 24 – Symphony No. 3 by Roy Harris, receives its world premiere in Boston, as Serge Koussevitzky conducts the Boston Symphony Orchestra
 April 9 – African-American contralto Marian Anderson performs before 75,000 people at the Lincoln Memorial in Washington, D.C., after having been denied the use both of Constitution Hall by the Daughters of the American Revolution, and of a public high school by the federally controlled District of Columbia. First Lady of the United States Eleanor Roosevelt resigns from the DAR because of their decision.
May 17 – Sergei Prokofiev's Alexander Nevsky (Op. 78) cantata debuts in Moscow. It is an adaptation from the 1938 film score to Alexander Nevsky.
May 22 – Columbia Recording Corporation incorporated in Delaware.
June 10 – Première of Arthur Bliss's Piano Concerto in B-flat with soloist Solomon; Arnold Bax's 7th Symphony; and Ralph Vaughan Williams' Five Variants of Dives and Lazarus, with the New York Philharmonic under Sir Adrian Boult at Carnegie Hall.
August 22 – "You Are My Sunshine" first recorded.
June 21 – Francis Poulenc's Organ Concerto is premièred in Paris.
November 1 – Bruno Walter leaves Germany for the United States.
December – Ali Akbar Khan accompanies Ravi Shankar on the sarod during the latter's debut performance at the annual music conference in Allahabad.
December 31 – A special concert of music by Johann Strauss II is performed by the Vienna Philharmonic conducted by Clemens Krauss in the great hall of the Musikverein in Vienna, predecessor of a continuing series of Vienna New Year's Concerts.
Harry James forms his own band with Frank Sinatra as vocalist.
The Nordstrom Sisters are the resident act at The Ritz Hotel, London.
Jo Stafford and The Pied Pipers join the Tommy Dorsey orchestra.
The Squadronaires form.
Dorothy Kirsten makes her professional concert debut at the New York World's Fair.
Manuel de Falla leaves Granada for exile in Argentina.

Publications
Ernst Krenek – Music Here and Now

Albums released
Featuring Charlie Christian – Benny Goodman
Cowboy Songs – Bing Crosby
Negro Sinful Songs – Lead Belly (Huddie Ledbetter)

Top popular recordings

The twenty-five popular records listed below were extracted from Joel Whitburn's Pop Memories 1890–1954, record sales reported on the "Discography of American Historical Recordings" website, and other sources as specified. Numerical rankings are approximate, they are only used as a frame of reference.

Additional recordings of historical interest, and songs that crossed over from Hillbilly (Country) and Race (R&B):

Race and blues hits

Christmas hits

Published popular music
 "Address Unknown" words and music: Carmen Lombardo, Johnny Marks & Dedette Lee Hill
 "All in Fun" words: Oscar Hammerstein II, music: Jerome Kern Introduced by Frances Mercer and Jack Whiting in the musical Very Warm for May
 "All or Nothing at All" w. Jack Lawrence m. Arthur Altman
 "All the Things You Are" w. Oscar Hammerstein II m. Jerome Kern from the musical Very Warm for May
 "Anatole (Of Paris)" w.m. Sylvia Fine Introduced by Danny Kaye in the revue The Straw Hat Revue
 "An Apple For the Teacher" w. Johnny Burke m. James V. Monaco
 "Are You Havin' Any Fun?" w. Jack Yellen m. Sammy Fain
 "The Army Air Corps" w.m. Robert M. Crawford
 "At the Woodchopper's Ball" m. Woody Herman & Joe Bishop
 "Back In The Saddle Again" w.m. Gene Autry & Ray Whitley
 "Between Eighteenth And Nineteenth On Chestnut Street" w.m. Will Osborne & Dick Rodgers
 "Bless You" w.m. Don Baker & Eddie Lane
 "Blue Orchids" w.m. Hoagy Carmichael
 "Bluebirds in the Moonlight" w. Leo Robin m. Ralph Rainger
 "The Boys in the Back Room" w. Frank Loesser m. Frederick Hollander. Introduced by Marlene Dietrich in the film Destry Rides Again.
 "Brazil" w. (Eng) Bob Russell m. Ary Baroso
 "Careless" w.m. Lew Quadling, Eddy Howard & Dick Jurgens
 "Comes Love" w.m. Sam H. Stept, Charles Tobias & Lew Brown
 "Cuckoo in the Clock" w. Johnny Mercer m. Walter Donaldson
 "Darn That Dream" w. Eddie DeLange m. Jimmy Van Heusen
 "Day In, Day Out" w. Johnny Mercer m. Rube Bloom
 "Desert Rumba" m. John Serry, Sr.
 "Ding-Dong! the Witch Is Dead" w. E. Y. Harburg m. Harold Arlen
 "Do I Love You?" w.m. Cole Porter
 "Don't Worry 'Bout Me" w. Ted Koehler m. Rube Bloom
 "Faithful Forever" w. Leo Robin m. Ralph Rainger
 "Flyin' Home" w. Sid Robin m. Lionel Hampton & Benny Goodman
 "Frenesi" w. (Eng) Ray Charles & Bob Russell m. Alberto Dominguez
 "The Gaucho Serenade" w.m. James Cavanaugh, John Redmond & Nat Simon
 "Give Him the Ooh-La-La" w.m. Cole Porter
 "Give it Back to the Indians" w. Lorenz Hart m. Richard Rodgers. Introduced by Mary Jane Walsh in the musical Too Many Girls.
 "Go Fly a Kite" w. Johnny Burke m. James V. Monaco
 "God Bless America" w.m. Irving Berlin
 "Good Morning" w. Arthur Freed m. Nacio Herb Brown
 "Goodnight, Children Ev'rywhere" w.m. Gabby Rogers & Harry Phillips
 "Hang Your Heart on a Hickory Limb" w. Johnny Burke m. James V. Monaco
 "Heaven Can Wait" w. Eddie DeLange m. Jimmy Van Heusen
"Heaven in My Arms" w. Oscar Hammerstein II m. Jerome Kern. Introduced by Jack Whiting, Frances Mercer and Hollace Shaw in the musical Very Warm for May
 "Honey Hush" Fats Waller, Ed Kirkeby
 "Huckleberry Duck" w. Jack Lawrence m. Raymond Scott
 "I Didn't Know What Time It Was" w. Lorenz Hart m. Richard Rodgers. Introduced by Richard Kollmar and Marcy Westcott in the musical Too Many Girls.  Performed by Trudy Erwin dubbing for Lucille Ball in the 1940 film version and interpolated into the score of the 1957 film Pal Joey where it was sung by Frank Sinatra.
 "I Get Along Without You Very Well (Except Sometimes)" m. Hoagy Carmichael w. Jane Brown Thompson
 "I Like to Recognize the Tune" w. Lorenz Hart m. Richard Rodgers. Introduced by Eddie Bracken, Marcy Westcott, Mary Jane Walsh, Richard Kollmar and Hal Le Roy in the musical Too Many Girls.
 "I Miss You in the Morning" w. Edgar Leslie m. Joe Burke
 "I Never Knew Heaven Could Speak" w. Mack Gordon m. Harry Revel
 "I Poured My Heart Into a Song" w.m. Irving Berlin
 "I Thought About You" w. Johnny Mercer m. Jimmy Van Heusen
 "I Want My Mama" w. (Port) Jararaca & Vincente Paiva (Eng) Al Stillman m. Jararaca & Vincente Paiva
 "I Went to a Marvelous Party" w.m. Noël Coward. Introduced by Beatrice Lillie in the revue Set to Music.
 "If a Grey Haired Lady Says "How's Yer Father?"" w.m. Ted Waite
 "If I Didn't Care" w.m. Jack Lawrence
 "If I Only Had a Brain" w. E. Y. Harburg m. Harold Arlen
 "If I Only Had Wings" w.m. Sid Colin & Ronnie Aldrich
 "I'll Never Smile Again" w.m. Ruth Lowe
 "I'll Walk Beside You" w.m. Alan Murray & Edward Lockton
 "I'm Building a Sailboat of Dreams" Cliff Friend, Dave Franklin
 "In a Mellow Tone" w. Milt Gabler m. Duke Ellington
 "In an Eighteenth Century Drawing Room" m. Raymond Scott
 "In the Middle of a Dream" w. Al Stillman m. Tommy Dorsey & Einar Swan
 "In The Mood" w. Andy Razaf m. Joe Garland
 "Is 'E An Aussie, Lizzie, Is 'E?" w.m. B. C. Hilliam & Malcolm McEachern
 "It's A Big, Wide, Wonderful World" w.m. John Rox
 "It's a Hap-Hap-Happy Day" w. Sammy Timberg & Winston Sharples m. Al J. Neiburg. Introduced by the voice of Lanny Ross on the soundtrack of the animated feature film Gulliver's Travels.
 "I've Got My Eyes On You" w.m. Cole Porter
 "J'attendrai" w. (Fr) Louis Poterat (Eng) Anna Sosenko m. Dino Olivieri
 "The Jumpin' Jive" w.m. Cab Calloway, Frank Froeba & Jack Palmer
 "Katie Went to Haiti" w.m. Cole Porter
 "Kiss Me Goodnight, Sergeant-Major" Art Noel, Don Pelosi
 "The Lady's In Love With You" w. Frank Loesser m. Burton Lane
 "The Lamp Is Low" w. Mitchell Parish m. Peter De Rose & Bert Shefter
 "Leanin' On The Ole Top Rail" w.m. Charles Kenny & Nick Kenny
 "Lili Marlene" w. (Ger) Hans Leip (Eng) Tommie Connor m. Norbert Schultze
 "The Little Man Who Wasn't There" w. Harold Adamson m. Bernie Hanighen
 "Love Never Went to College" w. Lorenz Hart m. Richard Rodgers
 "A Lover Is Blue" w.m. Charles Carpenter, James R. Mundy & Trummy Young
 "Lydia, The Tattooed Lady" w. E. Y. Harburg m. Harold Arlen. Introduced by Groucho Marx in the film At the Circus.
 "A Man and His Dream" w. Johnny Burke m. James V. Monaco
 "The Man With the Mandolin" w. James Cavanaugh & John Redmond m. Frank Weldon
 "The Masquerade Is Over" w. Herb Magidson m. Allie Wrubel
 "The Moon and the Willow Tree" w. Johnny Burke m. Victor Schertzinger
 "Moon Love" w.m. Mack David, Mack Davis & Andre Kostelanetz
 "Moonlight Serenade" w. Mitchell Parish m. Glenn Miller
 "My Dearest Dear" w.m. Ivor Novello & Christopher Hassall
 "My Prayer" w. Jimmy Kennedy m. Georges Boulanger & Jimmy Kennedy
 "Night in Sudan" w. Charles Carpenter m. Tommy Dorsey & Jimmy Mundy
 "On a Little Street in Singapore" w.m. Peter DeRose & Billy Hill
 "On The Outside Always Lookin' In" w.m. Michael Carr
 "Over The Rainbow" w. E. Y. Harburg m. Harold Arlen. Introduced by Judy Garland in the film The Wizard of Oz.
 "Palms in Paradise" w. Frank Loesser m. Frederick Hollander Introduced by Dorothy Lamour in the 1940 film Typhoon.
 "Pennsylvania 6-5000" w. Carl Sigman m. Jerry Gray
 "Perfidia" w. (Eng) Milton Leeds m. Alberto Dominguez
 "Run Rabbit Run" w. Noel Gay & Ralph T. Butler m. Noel Gay
 "Scatterbrain" w.m. Johnny Burke, Carl Bean, Kahn Keene & Frankie Masters
 "She Had to Go and Lose It at the Astor" w.m. Don Raye & Hugh Prince
 "Sing a Song of Sunbeams" w. Johnny Burke m. James V. Monaco
 "Sing My Heart" w. Ted Koehler m. Harold Arlen. Introduced by Irene Dunne in the film Love Affair.
 "Somewhere in France With You" w.m. Michael Carr
 "South American Way" w. Al Dubin m. Jimmy McHugh
 "South Of The Border" w.m. Jimmy Kennedy & Michael Carr
 "Stairway to the Stars" w. Mitchell Parish m. Matty Malneck
 "Start the Day Right" w.m. Al Lewis, Maurice Spitalny & Charles Tobias
 "Strange Fruit" w.m. Lewis Allan
 "Sunrise Serenade" w. Jack Lawrence m. Frankie Carle
 "Sweet Potato Piper" w. Johnny Burke m. James V. Monaco
 "'Tain't What You Do" w.m. Sy Oliver & Trummy Young
 "Tara's Theme" m. Max Steiner
 "That Sentimental Sandwich" w. Frank Loesser m. Frederick Hollander
 "That Sly Old Gentleman" w. Johnny Burke m. James V. Monaco
 "They Would Wind Him Up And He Would Whistle" Bert Kalmar, Harry Ruby
 "This Is It" w. Dorothy Fields m. Arthur Schwartz
 ""This Is No Dream" w.m. Tommy Dorsey, Benny Davis & Ted Shapiro
 "Three Little Fishes" w.m. Saxie Dowell
 "Till The Lights Of London Shine Again" w.m. Tommie Connor, Eddie Pola
 "To You" w.m. Tommy Dorsey, Benny Davis & Ted Shapiro
 "Too Romantic" w. Johnny Burke m. James V. Monaco
 "Traffic Jam" m. Teddy McRae & Artie Shaw
 "Tuxedo Junction" w. Buddy Feyne m. Erskine Hawkins, Williams Johnson & Julian Dash
 "Two Blind Loves" w. E. Y. Harburg m. Harold Arlen
 "Two O'Clock Jump" m. Harry James, Count Basie & Benny Goodman
 "Under a Blanket of Blue" w.m. Jerry Livingston, Al J. Neiburg, & Marty Symes
 "We'll Meet Again" w. Hughie Charles m. Ross Parker
 "Well, Did You Evah!" w. m. Cole Porter
 "We're Going to Hang out the Washing on the Siegfried Line" w.m. Jimmy Kennedy & Michael Carr
 "What's New?" w. Johnny Burke m. Bob Haggart
 "When You Wish upon a Star" w. Ned Washington m. Leigh Harline
 "Who's Taking You Home Tonight?" w.m. Manning Sherwin & Tommie Connor from the revue Shephard's Pie
 "Wish Me Luck" w.m. Harry Parr-Davies & Phil Park
 "Wishing (Will Make It So)" w.m. B. G. De Sylva
 "You Meet The Nicest People In Your Dreams" Al Hoffman, Al Goodhart, Manny Kurtz
 "You Taught Me to Love Again" w. Charles Carpenter m. Tommy Dorsey & Henri Woode
 "You've Got That Look" w. Frank Loesser m. Frederick Hollander from the film Destry Rides Again

Classical music

Premieres

Compositions
Samuel Barber – Violin Concerto
Agustín Barrios – Variations on a Theme of Tárrega
Arnold Bax – Pastoral Fantasia for Viola and String Orchestra
Béla Bartók
Divertimento for String Orchestra
String Quartet No. 6
Arthur Bliss – Piano Concerto in B-flat
Eugène Bozza
Divertissement for English horn (or alto saxophone) and piano, Op. 39
Fantaisie italienne for clarinet (or flute, or oboe) and piano
Fantaisie pastorale for oboe and piano, Op. 37
Ballade for bass clarinet and piano
Fantaisie italienne for clarinet (or flute, or oboe) and piano
Hanns Eisler – Spruch 1939
John Fernström – Symphony No. 5, Op. 40
Karl Amadeus Hartmann – Concerto funebre for violin and string orchestra
Herbert Howells – Concerto for Strings
Zoltán Kodály – Variations on a Hungarian folk song "Fölszállott a páva" ("The Peacock")
Frank Martin – Ballade for flute and piano
Joaquín Rodrigo – Concierto de Aranjuez
Hilding Rosenberg – String Quartet No. 4
William Schuman – American Festival Overture
Dmitri Shostakovich – Symphony No. 6 in B minor, Op. 54
Alexandre Tansman – Symphony No. 4
Heitor Villa-Lobos – New York Sky-Line Melody
William Walton – Violin Concerto

Opera
Gian Carlo Menotti – The Old Maid and the Thief (radio opera)
Tolib Sodiqov – Leili and Mejnun

Film
Aaron Copland – Of Mice and Men (1939 film)
Aaron Copland – The City (1939 film)
Erich Korngold – Juarez (film)
Alfred Newman – Gunga Din (film)
Dmitri Shostakovich – The Great Citizen
Max Steiner – Gone with the Wind

Jazz

Musical theatre
 Black Velvet London revue opened at the Hippodrome Theatre on November 14 and ran for 620 performances
 The Dancing Years London production opened at the Drury Lane Theatre on March 23 and ran for 187 performances
 Du Barry Was A Lady Broadway production opened at the 46th Street Theatre on December 6 and ran for 408 performances
 Folies Bergère Broadway revue opened at the Broadway Theatre on December 25 and ran for 121 performances
 George White's Scandals of 1939 Broadway revue opened at the Alvin Theatre on August 28 and ran for 120 performances
 Haw-Haw (Music: Harry Parr Davies Words: Phil Park Script: Max Miller & Ben Lyon) opened at the Holborn Empire on December 22. Starring Bebe Daniels, Ben Lyon and Max Miller.
 The Little Revue London revue opened at The Little Theatre on April 21 and ran for 415 performances
 Magyar Melody London production opened at His Majesty's Theatre on January 20 and ran for 105 performances
 New Pins And Needles Broadway revue (a renamed version of Pins and Needles which opened in 1937)
Runaway Love opened at the Saville Theatre on November 3 and ran for 195 performances
Shephard's Pie London revue opened at the Princes Theatre on December 21
 Stars in Your Eyes (Book: J. P. McEvoy Lyrics: Dorothy Fields Music: Arthur Schwartz) Broadway production opened at the Majestic Theatre on February 9 and ran for 127 performances.
The Straw Hat Revue opened at the Ambassador Theatre on September 29 and ran for 75 performances
 The Streets of Paris Broadway revue opened at the Broadhurst Theatre on June 19 and ran for 274 performances
 Swingin' the Dream Broadway production opened at the Center Theatre on November 29 and ran for 13 performances. A musical version of A Midsummer Night's Dream starring Louis Armstrong, Benny Goodman & his Sextet and Maxine Sullivan.
 Too Many Girls Broadway production opened at the Imperial Theatre on October 18 and ran for 249 performances.
Very Warm for May Broadway production opened at the Alvin Theatre on November 17 and ran for 59 performances

Musical films

 Babes In Arms, starring Mickey Rooney and Judy Garland
 Balalaika, released on December 15, starring Nelson Eddy and Ilona Massey
 Entre el barro, starring Tito Lusiardo
 East Side of Heaven, starring Bing Crosby and Joan Blondell
 Giliw Ko, starring Mila del Sol, Fernando Poe, Sr., Ely Ramos and Fleur de Lis
 Hawaiian Nights, starring Mary Carlisle, Constance Moore and Johnny Downs. Directed by Albert S. Rogell.
 Honolulu, starring Eleanor Powell, Robert Young, George Burns and Gracie Allen
 Lambeth Walk, starring Lupino Lane
 La vida es un tango, starring Tito Lusiardo
 Love Affair, starring Charles Boyer, Irene Dunne and Maria Ouspenskaya. Directed by Leo McCarey.
 Man About Town, released June 29, starring Dorothy Lamour and Jack Benny, featuring Betty Grable, Phil Harris and Matty Malneck and his Orchestra.
 The Mikado, starring Kenny Baker and Jean Colin
 Naughty but Nice, starring Ann Sheridan and Dick Powell
 Paris Honeymoon, starring Bing Crosby, Franciska Gaal, Shirley Ross and Edward Everett Horton
 Second Fiddle, starring Sonja Henie, Tyrone Power, Rudy Vallee and Mary Healy. Directed by Sidney Lanfield.
The Star Maker, released on August 25, starring Bing Crosby
 Three Smart Girls Grow Up, starring Deanna Durbin
 Walang Sugat, starring Rosa del Rosario
 The Wizard of Oz starring Judy Garland, Frank Morgan, Billie Burke, Ray Bolger, Bert Lahr and Jack Haley.

Births
January 3
Gene Summers, singer-songwriter (died 2021)
Arik Einstein, Israeli singer (died 2013)
January 9 – Jimmy Boyd, singer and actor (died 2009)
January 10 – Scott McKenzie, singer (died 2012)
January 12 – William Lee Golden, country singer (The Oakridge Boys)
January 19 – Phil Everly (The Everly Brothers) (died 2014)
January 21 – Wolfman Jack, DJ (died 1995)
February 1
Del McCoury, American singer and guitarist (Del McCoury Band)
Joe Sample, American pianist and composer (The Crusaders) (died 2014)
February 9 – Barry Mann, songwriter
February 11 – Gerry Goffin, songwriter (died 2014)
February 12 – Ray Manzarek, keyboard player (The Doors) (died 2013)
February 16 – Czesław Niemen, Polish singer-songwriter, rock balladeer (died 2004)
February 28
John Fahey, guitarist and composer (died 2001)
Tommy Tune, actor, singer and dancer
March 1
Leo Brouwer, Cuban composer and guitarist
Warren Davis, doo-wop singer (The Monotones) (died 2017)
March 8 – Robert Tear, tenor
March 11 – Flaco Jiménez, accordionist and singer
March 13 – Neil Sedaka, pianist and singer-songwriter
March 18 – Peter Kraus, German singer
March 27 – Beba Selimović, sevdalinka folk singer (died 2020)
April 1 – Rudolph Isley, R&B singer (The Isley Brothers)
April 2 – Marvin Gaye, soul singer (died 1984)
April 4 – Hugh Masekela, jazz trumpeter (died 2018)
April 5 – Ronnie White, R&B musician and songwriter (The Miracles) (died 1995)
April 6 – Beverly Watkins, blues guitarist (died 2019)
April 16 – Dusty Springfield, singer (died 1999)
April 18 – Glen Hardin, rock pianist and arranger (The Crickets)
April 20 – Johnny Tillotson, singer and songwriter
April 21
Ernie Maresca, singer, songwriter and record industry executive (died 2015)
John McCabe, composer and pianist (died 2015)
April 23 – Wizz Jones, guitarist, singer and songwriter
May 1 – Judy Collins, singer
May 3 – Jonathan Harvey, English composer (died 2012)
May 7
José Antonio Abreu, orchestral conductor and music educator (died 2018)
Johnny Maestro, vocalist (died 2010)
Jimmy Ruffin, singer (died 2014)
May 9 – Nokie Edwards, rock musician (The Ventures) (died 2018)
May 10 – Wayne Cochran, American singer (died 2017)
May 14 – Troy Shondell, American singer (died 2016)
May 19
Nancy Kwan, dancer, singer and actress
Sonny Fortune, jazz musician
John Sheahan, folk musician (The Dubliners)
May 23 – Michel Colombier, composer and songwriter (died 2004)
June 3 – Ian Hunter, British rock singer and songwriter (Mott The Hoople)
June 6
Louis Andriessen, composer (died 2021)
Gary U.S. Bonds, singer and songwriter
June 9 – Ileana Cotrubaş, operatic soprano
June 11 – Wilma Burgess, American country music singer (died 2003)
June 16 – Billy "Crash" Craddock, country singer
June 19 – Al Wilson, American soul singer (died 2008)
June 25 – Garech Browne, promoter of Irish traditional music (died 2018)
June 30 – Tony Hatch, composer, songwriter, pianist, music arranger and record producer
July 1 – Delaney Bramlett, blues singer-songwriter (Delaney & Bonnie) (died 2008)
July 2 – Paul Williams, soul singer (The Temptations) (died 1973)
July 3 – Brigitte Fassbaender, operatic mezzo-soprano
July 5 – Owen Gray, Jamaican singer
July 6 – Jet Harris, British bassist, singer and songwriter (The Shadows) (died 2011)
July 14
Karel Gott, singer (died 2019)
Vince Taylor, rock and roll singer (died 1991)
July 16 – William Bell, born William Yarbrough, soul singer-songwriter
July 17 – Spencer Davis, beat musician, multi-instrumentalist (The Spencer Davis Group) (died 2020)
July 18
Brian Auger, jazz fusion keyboard player (Brian Auger Trinity)
Dion DiMucci, singer-songwriter
July 25 – Denis King, pop singer and screen composer
July 31 – Steuart Bedford, conductor and pianist (died 2021)
August 4 – Frankie Ford, singer (died 2015)
August 9
Billy Henderson R&B soul singer (The Spinners) (died 2007)
The Mighty Hannibal, American singer, songwriter and record producer (died 2014)
August 13 – Howard Tate, American soul singer, songwriter (died 2011)
August 15 – Norma Waterson, English traditional folk singer (died 2022)
August 16
Billy Joe Shaver, American singer-songwriter and guitarist (died 2020)
Eric Weissberg, American folk musician (died 2020)
August 17
Luther Allison, blues guitarist (died 1997)
Ed Sanders, poet and folk singer (The Fugs)
August 18
 Molly Bee, American country music singer (died 2009)
 Johnny Preston, American singer (died 2011)
August 19 – Ginger Baker, rock drummer (Cream) (died 2019)
August 24 – Ernest Wright, R&B singer (Little Anthony and the Imperials)
August 25 – Robert Jager, American composer and theorist
August 28 – Robert Aitken, composer
August 30 – John Peel (John Ravenscroft), influential disc jockey (died 2004)
August 31
Jerry Allison, American rock drummer (The Crickets) (died 2022)
Cleveland Eaton, American jazz musician (died 2020)
September 2
Sam Gooden, soul singer (The Impressions) (died 2022)
Bobby Lee Dickey, singer
September 5 – John Stewart, folk singer and songwriter (died 2008)
September 6 – David Allan Coe, American musician
September 7 – Riccardo Del Turco, Italian singer
September 8 – Guitar Shorty, American blues guitarist (died 2022)
September 13 – Gene Page, arranger, producer and conductor (died 1998)
September 17 – Shelby Flint, American singer
September 18 – Frankie Avalon, singer and actor
September 23 – Roy Buchanan, guitarist (died 1988)
September 28 – Elbridge Bryant (The Temptations) (died 1975)
September 30 – Len Cariou, Canadian actor and singer
October 16 – Joe Dolan, Irish entertainer, recording artist and pop singer (died 2007)
October 18 – Paddy Reilly, folk musician
October 30
Eddie Holland, songwriter (Holland/Dozier/Holland)
Grace Slick, vocalist (Jefferson Airplane)
October 31 – Gordon Bok, singer-songwriter
November 12 – Ruby Nash Curtis, R&B singer (Ruby & the Romantics)
November 15 – Dinorah Varsi, Uruguayan classical pianist (died 2013)
November 17 – Yuya Uchida, singer and film actor (died 2019)
November 18 – Tom Johnson, minimalist composer
November 19 – Warren "Pete" Moore, R&B singer-songwriter (The Miracles) (died 2017)
November 22 – Stefan Dimitrov, Bulgarian operatic bass (died 2004)
November 23
Betty Everett, African-American soul singer, pianist (died 2001)
Jan Rooney, American singer and wife of Mickey Rooney
November 25 – Rais Khan, Pakistani sitarist (died 2017)
November 26 – Tina Turner, pop singer
November 28 – Gary Troxel, pop singer (The Fleetwoods)
December 1 – Dianne Lennon, American singer (The Lennon Sisters)
December 4 – Freddy Cannon, American rock musician
December 8
 Jerry Butler, African-American singer-songwriter and politician
Sir James Galway, flautist
December 13 – Eric Flynn, British actor and singer (died 2002)
December 15 – Cindy Birdsong, soul singer (The Supremes)
Dave Clark (The Dave Clark Five)
December 16 – Barney McKenna, folk musician (The Dubliners) (died 2012)
December 17
James Booker, pianist and singer (died 1983)
Eddie Kendricks, vocalist (The Temptations) (died 1992)
December 25 – Bob James, jazz keyboardist
December 26 – Phil Spector, record producer and murderer (died 2021)
December 28 – Yehoram Gaon, Israeli actor and singer
December 30 – Felix Pappalardi, rock producer and bassist (Mountain) (died 1983)

Deaths
January 12 – Hariclea Darclée, operatic soprano, 78
January 16 – Abe Holzmann, composer, 64
February 9 – Herschel Evans, saxophonist, 29 (heart disease)
February 11 – Franz Schmidt, cellist, pianist and composer, 64
February 12 – Potenciano Gregorio, Filipino musician, 58
February 17 – Willy Hess, violinist, 79
March 6 – Emma Juch, operatic soprano, 77
March 9 – Ernie Hare, US singer, 55 (bronchopneumonia)
March 21 – Evald Aav, Estonian composer, 39
April 8 – Emilio Serrano y Ruiz, pianist and composer, 89
April 21
Herman Finck, composer, 66
Joe Young, US lyricist, 49
May 20 – Alexandra Čvanová, operatic soprano, 42 (car accident)
June 4 – Tommy Ladnier, jazz trumpeter, 39 (heart attack)
June 16 – Chick Webb, jazz drummer, 34
August 1 – Álvaro Sousa, composer, 60
August 3 – August Enna, composer, 80
August 19 – Achille Fortier, composer, 74
August 25 – Geneviève Vix, operatic soprano, 60
October 9 – Evelyn Parnell, operatic soprano, 51 (appendicitis)
October 14 – Polaire, singer and actress, 65
October 16 – Ludolf Nielsen, pianist, violinist, conductor and composer, 63
October 19 – Marie Renard, operatic mezzo-soprano, 75
October 24 – Prince Joachim Albert of Prussia, composer, 63
October 27 – Nelly Bromley, singer and actress, 89
October 28 – Alice Brady, actress, 46
October 29 – Giulio Crimi, operatic tenor, 54
November 3 (or 4) – Charles Tournemire, organist and composer, 69
November 9 – Charles Goulding, operatic tenor (born 1887)
December 6 – Charles Dalmorès, operatic tenor, 68
December 8 – Ernest Schelling, pianist, composer and conductor, 63
December 18
Jeanne Granier, operatic soprano, 87
Grikor Suni, composer, 63
December 22 – Ma Rainey, blues singer, 53 (heart attack)
date unknown
Francisco de Paula Aguirre, composer of waltzes (born 1875)
José Perches Enríquez, composer (born 1883)
Lena Wilson, blues singer (born 1898)

References

 
20th century in music
Music by year